Lunata is a locality of the commune of Capannori in the Province of Lucca, Tuscany, central Italy, one of the forty frazioni identified in the municipal statute. It is some 7 km from the city of Lucca.

Notes

External links

Frazioni of the Province of Lucca
Cities and towns in Tuscany